Uruguayan Portuguese, also known as  and Riverense, and referred to by its speakers as , is a variety of Portuguese in South America with heavy influence from Rioplatense Spanish. It is spoken in north-eastern Uruguay, near the Brazilian border, mainly in the region of the twin cities of Rivera (Uruguay) and Santana do Livramento (Brazil). This section of the frontier is called  ("Border of Peace"), because there is no legal obstacle to crossing the border between the two countries.

The varieties of Uruguayan Portuguese share many similarities with the countryside dialects of the southern Brazilian state of Rio Grande do Sul, such as the denasalization of final unstressed nasal vowels, replacement of lateral palatal  with semivowel , no raising of final unstressed , alveolar trill  instead of the guttural R, and lateral realization of coda  instead of L-vocalization. This is rare among accents of Portuguese.

History 
The origin of Portuguese in Uruguay can be traced back to the time of the dominion of the kingdoms of Spain and Portugal, and the Empire of Brazil. In those times, the ownership of those lands was not very well defined, passing back and forth from the hands of one crown to the other. Before its independence after the Cisplatine War in 1828, Uruguay was one of the provinces of the Empire of Brazil.

Portuguese was the only language spoken throughout northern Uruguay until the end of the 19th century. To assure the homogeneity of the newly formed country, the government made an effort to impose the Spanish language into lusophone communities through educational policies and language planning, and bilingualism became widespread and diglossic.

Phonology

Vowels

Consonants

See also 
 Differences between Spanish and Portuguese

References

Bibliography
CARVALHO, Ana Maria. Variation and diffusion of Uruguayan Portuguese in a bilingual border town, by Ana Maria Carvalho, University of California at Berkeley USA. (PDF)
 Douglas, Kendra. 2004. Uruguayan Portuguese in Artigas: Tri-dimensionality of transitional local varieties in contact with Spanish and Portuguese standards. Madison, WI:  University of Wisconsin Ph.D. dissertation.
 (PDF)
 Nicolás Brian, Claudia Brovetto, Javier Geymonat, Portugués del Uruguay y educación bilingüe
  [Contains a section on Portuñol].

External links 
 Page about Uruguayan Portunhol (in Portuguese) at Unicamp - University of Campinas, São Paulo (in Portuguese)
 Adolfo Elizaincín website
  Portuñol, a new language that is gaining popularity among people who live close to the borders of Brazil and its neighboring Spanish-speaking countries

Portuguese dialects
Portuguese language in the Americas
Languages of Uruguay
Languages of Brazil
Rivera Department
Brazil–Uruguay border